Buck Meek (born Alexander Buckley Meek, July 10, 1987) is an American musician from Wimberley, Texas, best known as the guitarist and backing vocalist of Big Thief.

Early life 
Meek was raised in Texas and was introduced to the guitar at a young age, playing blues and folk at local venues in his youth. Similarly to the other members of Big Thief, Meek attended Berklee College of Music, but he did not form a band with his future bandmates until after they had graduated. After Berklee, Meek moved to New York City, busking at the 14th Street-Union Square and Bedford Avenue subway stations to pay his rent.

Career 
In 2014, Meek released two EPs with Adrianne Lenker, a-sides and b-sides. The following year Meek formed Big Thief with Lenker and Max Oleartchik after they met Oleartchik in Bushwick, Brooklyn, recognising him from Berklee College. Meek has recorded five studio albums with Big Thief to critical acclaim. Their 2019 album U.F.O.F. was nominated for the Grammy Award for Best Alternative Music Album. Meek released an eponymous debut solo album in May 2018, and Two Saviors in January 2021. Two Saviors was recorded at the corner of Royal and Desire in New Orleans, LA alongside producer Andrew Sarlo, who also worked on all of Big Thief's studio albums.

Meek appeared in the Alma Har'el-directed Bob Dylan concert film Shadow Kingdom: The Early Songs of Bob Dylan, which debuted on Veeps.com on July 18, 2021.

Personal life 
Meek and bandmate Adrianne Lenker married after they met in New York. The couple divorced in 2018.

Discography

Solo
Studio albums
 Buck Meek (Keeled Scales, 2018)
 Two Saviors (Keeled Scales, 2021)

EPs
 a-sides (with Adrianne Lenker; Saddle Creek, 2014)
 b-sides (with Adrianne Lenker; Saddle Creek, 2014)

With Big Thief
 Masterpiece (Saddle Creek, 2016)
 Capacity (Saddle Creek, 2017)
 U.F.O.F. (4AD, 2019)
 Two Hands (4AD, 2019)
 Dragon New Warm Mountain I Believe in You (4AD, 2022)

References 

Living people
American male singer-songwriters
Berklee College of Music alumni
Guitarists from Texas
1987 births
Big Thief members
Singer-songwriters from Texas